Molesworth Street is located at the north end of the central business district of Wellington, the capital city of New Zealand. Leading from the northern end of Lambton Quay, central Wellington's main street, it is a northbound one-way street linking the CBD with Tinakori Road, and through it, with main routes north out of the city. The street was named for Sir William Molesworth, 8th Baronet, a prominent member of the New Zealand Company. There is another Molesworth Street in the Wellington metropolitan area, located in the Lower Hutt suburb of Taitā.

Many of New Zealand's main governmental and archival institutions are located on Molesworth Street, most notably New Zealand Parliament Buildings, which are located at the street's southern end. The iconic Beehive is a major landmark close to the street's junction with Lambton Quay and Bowen Street. The New Zealand High Court is also located at the southern end of the building, directly opposite Parliament Buildings.

Other prominent buildings on or near Molesworth Street include the Court of Appeal, St Paul's Cathedral (Anglican) and the National Library of New Zealand, which also holds Ngā Taonga Sound & Vision. Molesworth Street was also the site of New Zealand's first national cenotaph (this was later moved to the National War Memorial on Buckle Street, 2000 metres to the south).

As the centre of political activity in New Zealand, Molesworth Street has been the site of many important events in New Zealand's history, including a large number of political protests. Prominent among these protests were those against the 1981 South African rugby tour, where on 29 July 1981, for the first time in New Zealand, police batoned political protesters.

Gallery

References

Streets in Wellington City